Kappil may refer to:

Kappil, Alappuzha, Kerala, India
Kappil, Thiruvananthapuram, Kerala, India
Kappil Bhagavathy Temple
Kappil railway station